Mount Wilcox can refer to:
Mount Wilcox (Alberta) in Alberta, Canada
 Mount Wilcox (Colorado) in Colorado, United States
Mount Wilcox (Antarctica) in Antarctica